The Our Lady of Mount Carmel Parish, commonly referred as Nuestra Señora Del Carmen Parish, (Filipino: Parokya ng Birhen ng Bundok ng Karmelo) (Spanish: Iglesia Parroquial de la Nuestra Señora del Monte Carmelo) is a Roman Catholic Church situated in Barangay Pulong Buhangin, Santa Maria, in the province of Bulacan, Philippines. It is under the coat of arms and jurisdiction of the Roman Catholic Bishop of Malolos and within the Vicariate of Santa Maria.

Having been one of with rich history of origination, constant miracles and intercessions to her beloved land of Barrio Pulong Buhangin, and by the clamor of its devotees, the image has been granted with episcopal coronation on September 8, 2019. The devotees always pray and excitingly await for the image to be granted with canonical coronation, the highest honor that can be given to an image by the Catholic Church.

Barangay Pulong Buhangin celebrates its barrio fiesta every third Sunday of February to commemorate the arrival of the image of our lady, otherwise known as "translacion" to the barrio. The parish also celebrates the feast of Our Lady of Mount Carmel every July 16.

History 
The parish was established on November 25, 1940, by the decree of the Archbishop of Manila, Rev. Michael J. O'Doherty. This decree separated the barrios of Pulong Buhangin, Quepombo, Catmon, Tigbe, among others from the jurisdiction of La Purisima Concepcion Parish in Santa Maria. The parochial vicar of La Purisima Concepcion Parish at that time, Rev. Msgr. Jose B. Aguinaldo was installed as its first parish priest.

The present day church was constructed in late 1950s where laborers were paid only five working days and donated their sixth working day to the church. Then after, the Archbishop of Manila, Rufino Cardinal Santos blessed the newly constructed church. This is the product of the grace of Our Lady of Mount Carmel and many years of toil and labor of the people of Pulong Buhangin, including generous donors (one of the donors was the archbishop himself). From a small chapel, it underwent renovation through the years into what it is today.

Various improvements were made to the church, through its parish priests, parishioners and devotees who wholeheartedly served the church. In 2007, through the supervision of Rev. Fr. Elmer R. Ignacio, S.Th.L., the incumbent parish priest at that time, the altar underwent a major renovation for its centennial fiesta and church dedication which took place on February 17, 2008, and November 16, 2008, respectively. The centennial fiesta had the theme: "Pamanang Pananampalataya, Bayang Naglilingkod" (Legacy of faith, a community that serves to God). Centennial markers were placed near the main door and the middle of the church grounds to commemorate the historical event. The relic of St. Therese of the Child Jesus, a prominent figure in the Carmelite society and one of the doctors of the church, was brought in the parish last 2008.

During the incumbency of Rev. Fr. Edgardo de Jesus, several improvements were also introduced in the church vicinity, such as the installation of statues of prominent saints connected to the Our Lady of Mount Carmel at the church fence, the church museum, mini-garden and wishing well, audio-visual room, and renovation of adoration chapel, among others.

On March 23, 2016, the parish celebrated its diamond jubilee year. The opening of the year-long celebration was through a Eucharistic celebration, spearheaded by Most. Rev. Deogracias Iniguez, Jr. D.D., Bishop Emeritus of Caloocan, Most. Rev. Cirilo Almario Jr., D.D., Bishop Emeritus of Malolos, and several clergy of the Diocese.

The retablo features a gold-painted bronze statue, depicting a risen Christ with a cross backdrop. This signifies that Christ has triumphed over death, as symbolized by a risen Christ over a cross (interpretation should not be taken out of literal context). The nine-foot tall statue was specially crafted by Sandro Castrillo, a famous sculptor. The church also features its wooden parish logo and maidens offering flowers and fruits installed at the front of the church dome, handcrafted by Philippine National Artist, Napoleon Abueva.

Miraculous Image of Our Lady of Mount Carmel in Pulong Buhangin 
The church is home to a miraculous 357-year old ivory image of Our Lady of Mount Carmel. Legend says an old lady (believed as the Virgin Mary) approached an old man dwelling in the barrio named "Kunino" and instructed him to build a chapel. The old lady gave a letter and said that it must be presented to Simeon and Simeona, the richest spouses in the barrio to provide him the funds needed for the construction. Kunino approached the spouses and gave the letter. Simeon and Simeona refused to the request and then the letter was put into fire. To the surprise of the witnesses, the letter was not consumed by fire. This was considered one of the first miracles of our lady in the barrio. Due to shock of what happened, the spouses immediately ordered the construction of the chapel. After this event, the old lady  appeared again to Kunino, and instructed him to get an image of Our Lady from the friars in San Sebastian Church (Manila). Kunino followed the instructions set forth by the old lady and went to San Sebastian Church. He requested an image of the Our Lady of Mount Carmel to the friars. At first, Kunino brought a sketch of the Our Lady, but the old lady appeared again and said that he must request for an image. Kunino went back to San Sebastian Church. Before the friars granted the image, Kunino endured the conditions provided by the friars, one of which is that Kunino must stay in the church for nine days to pray, in order to test his faith and determination. Pilgrims from Lipa, Batangas were likewise present to request for an image. Nevertheless, the original image meant for Kunino was given to the pilgrims of Lipa. This became the infamous Our Lady of Mount Carmel Parish in Lipa, Batangas, where rose petals showered in 1948 (however, this event was subsequently debunked by the Holy See due to it being with insufficient evidence or no 'supernatural origin'). The friars made another image, crafted specially for Kunino. On February 9, 1665, the image was brought by Kunino from San Sebastian Church to the barrio of Pulong Buhangin. This event is also known as "traslacion". In commemoration of the arrival, the barrio of Pulong Buhangin celebrates its barrio fiesta every month of February. The image is currently enshrined and venerated at the main altar of the church.

An excerpt of the book entitled "Kasaysayan ng Nuestra Senora del Carmen"  details on how the image was brought from San Sebastian to the barrio of Pulong Buhangin:

"Nang kay Kuninong tanggapin

ang rebulto ng Del Karmen

buong lugod ng panimdim

di natumigil, noon din

umuwi sa Pulong Buhangin.

Nang idating naman dito

sa Pulong Buhanging barrio

ang sa Del Karmeng rebulto

Lunes noon ng Pebrero

ika- siyam namang husto.

Noo'y apat na raan na

na apat saka apat pa

nang bilang limang po at isa

na edad ng mundo't siglang

binabagtas ng lahat na."

Episcopal Coronation of the Revered Image 

On May 31, 2019, the Diocese of Malolos, through the authority of the bishop of the Diocese of Cubao and by then concurrently the Apostolic Administrator of the Diocese of Malolos, Most. Rev. Honesto F. Ongtioco, D.D. has promulgated a decree, granting an episcopal coronation of the revered image of the Our Lady of Mount Carmel of San Sebastian of Pulong Buhangin. The decree was originally signed by Most. Rev. Honesto F. Ongtioco, D.D. and Rev. Fr. Cenon Dennis G. Santos, Chancellor of the Diocese. It was read as follows:

"Ad Perpetuam Rei Memoriam - Decretum: On the occasion of the 354 years of devotion to Our Lady of Mount Carmel, I, Honesto Flores Ongtioco, D.D., Bishop of Cubao and Apostolic Administrator of Malolos, by the grace of God and the Apostolic See, and by virtue of the power granted upon me, after having reviewed the petition made by the Parish of Our Lady of Mount Carmel Pulong Buhangin, Santa Maria, Bulacan,through its parish priest, the Rev. Fr. Edgardo C. de Jesus, do hereby decree and promulgate: The Solemn Episcopal Coronation of the Image of Our Lady of Mount Carmel. May Mary, our blessed mother, the Virgin of Mount Carmel continue to intercede for us. Given on this 31st day of May, Feast of Visitation of the Blessed Virgin Mary, in the year of our Lord, 2019, National Year of the Youth at the Cathedral - Basilica Minore of the Immaculate Conception, Malolos City, Bulacan."

The image was solemnly crowned on September 8, 2019, the feast of the nativity of the Blessed Virgin Mary. The episcopal coronation and the Eucharistic celebration was spearheaded by the fifth bishop of Malolos, Most. Rev. Dennis C. Villarojo, D.D., together with Most. Rev. Honesto F. Ongtioco, D.D., Bishop of Cubao and former Apostolic Administrator of the Diocese of Malolos, Most. Rev. Wilfredo Manlapaz, D.D., Bishop Emeritus of Tagum, Most. Rev. Benjamin Almoneda, D.D., Bishop Emeritus of Daet and the clergy of the Diocese. This is the first Marian coronation headed by Most. Rev. Dennis Villarojo, since assuming the episcopacy of the Diocese of Malolos.
 

More than a thousand devotees joined to reenact Kunino's "translacion" from San Sebastian Church to Barrio Pulong Buhangin and flocked to the parish to witness the coronation of the beloved Patroness and Queen of Barrio Pulong Buhangin. The parish officially presents the title of the image as "Nuestra Señora del Carmen de San Sebastian de Pulong Buhangin" Ina at Reyna ng Pulong Buhangin. (English: Our Lady of Mount Carmel of Saint Sebastian of Pulong Buhangin, Mother and Queen of Pulong Buhangin).

As commemoration for the historic event, the Parish issued memorabilia e.g. limited edition shirts, compact disks (CDs) containing originally-produced music for the coronation and scapulars, among others. The church's retablo was also redesigned to adjust the pedestal of Impo Karmen to the center of the altar. Vine chandeliers were also installed at the ceiling of the church, and a huge crown-shaped chandelier was installed in the parish building, symbolizing the coronation.

Parish Priests of the church 
The following priests have served the church.

Present Administration 

The parish is currently under the pastorship of  Rev. Fr. Virgilio "Vergs" C. Ramos as the 16th parish priest (Filipino: Kura Paroko) of the church and is the de facto chairman of the Parish Pastoral Council. Fr. Vergs' previous post was the parish priest and rector of San Pascual Baylon Parish and the National Shrine of Our Lady of Salambao in Obando, Bulacan. Fr. Vergs was formally installed in the parish on February 15, 2021.

References

External links 

Santa Maria, Bulacan
Roman Catholic churches in Bulacan
Churches in the Roman Catholic Diocese of Malolos